The Federal Neuro Psychiatric Hospital, also known as Yaba Psychiatric  Hospital or Yaba Left, is a Nigerian Federal psychiatric hospital  in Yaba, a suburb of Lagos.

History
Yaba Psychiatric Hospital was established in Lagos in 1907 as Yaba Asylum. Mental health care was provided by medical officers  before the emergence of mental health professionals; psychiatrists and psychologists in custodial interventions.

References

External links

Hospitals in Lagos
Hospitals established in 1907
1907 establishments in the Southern Nigeria Protectorate
Psychiatric hospitals in Nigeria
Yaba, Lagos